The 5th Secretariat of the Workers' Party of Korea (WPK)(5차 조선로동당 비서국), officially the Secretariat of the 5th Congress of the Workers' Party of Korea, was elected by the 1st Plenary Session of the 5th Central Committee on 13 November 1970.

Members

Add ons

References

Citations

Bibliography
Books:
 
 
  

Dissertations:
 

5th Secretariat of the Workers' Party of Korea
1970 establishments in North Korea
1980 disestablishments in North Korea